Tarialan (lit. "arable land") is a sum of Khövsgöl aimag.
In 2007, Tarialan had a population of 5,855 people (largest rural sum in Khövsgöl aimag and 2nd most populous after the aimag capital Mörön). The sum center, officially named Badrakh, in 2007 had 2,981 inhabitants and was the 2nd most populous settlement in the aimag after its capital.

History 

The Tarialian sum was founded, together with the whole Khövsgöl aimag, in 1931. In 1933, it had 3,000 inhabitants in 908 households, and about 50,000 heads of livestock. In 1937, it became seat of a hay production base, which was expanded to a tractor base in 1938. The base became a state farm in 1943.

Climate

Tarialan has a subarctic climate (Köppen climate classification Dwc) bordering on a humid continental climate (Köppen climate classification Dwb) with mild summers and severely cold winters. Most precipitation falls in the summer as rain, with some snow in the adjacent months of May and September. Winters are very dry.

Economy 

Arable farming is the basis of the sum economy, so population is dominantly settled in the sum centre.

Minor part of the sum population is pastoral nomadic or seminomadic. 
In 2007, there were about 153,000 heads of livestock, among them 69,000 goats, 59,000 sheep, 17,000 cattle and yaks, 8,000 horses and 23 camels.

Miscellaneous 

The place where Baron Ungern was captured in August 1921 is today on the border between Tarialan and Teshig sum of Bulgan aimag.

References

Literature 

M. Nyamaa, Khövsgöl aimgiin lavlakh toli, Ulaanbaatar 2001, p. 129f

Districts of Khövsgöl Province